Eze Nri Ọmalonyeso was the sixth king of Nri Kingdom after succeeding Eze Nri Jiọfọ I. He was succeeded by Eze Nri Anyamata after he reigned from 1391–1464 CE.

References

Nri-Igbo
Nri monarchs
Kingdom of Nri
14th-century monarchs in Africa
15th-century monarchs in Africa